Pidayeva is a rural locality (a village) in Stepanovskoye Rural Settlement, Kudymkarsky District, Perm Krai, Russia. The population was 59 as of 2010. There are 5 streets.

Geography 
Pidayeva is located 9 km south of Kudymkar (the district's administrative centre) by road. Kekur is the nearest rural locality.

References 

Rural localities in Kudymkarsky District